Korita na Krasu is a settlement west of Kostanjevica na Krasu in the Municipality of Miren-Kostanjevica in the Littoral region of Slovenia, close to the border with Italy.

Name
The name of the settlement was changed from Korita to Korita na Krasu in 1955.

Mass grave
Korita na Krasu is the site of a mass grave possibly associated with the Second World War. Although the grave contains human remains, the configuration of the shaft casts doubt on whether it is a concealed grave from the war.

References

External links
Korita na Krasu on Geopedia

Populated places in the Municipality of Miren-Kostanjevica